In astrophysics, the term de Sitter effect (named after the Dutch physicist Willem de Sitter) has been applied to two unrelated phenomena:

 De Sitter double star experiment
 De Sitter precession – also known as geodetic precession or the geodetic effect

Astrophysics